The Church of San Juan Bautista (Spanish: Iglesia Parroquial de San Juan Bautista) is a Roman Catholic church located in Alatoz, Spain. It was declared Bien de Interés Cultural in 1991.

The neoclassical-style church was erected 1761–1776.

References 

San Juan Bautista (Alatoz)
Bien de Interés Cultural landmarks in the Province of Albacete
18th-century Roman Catholic church buildings in Spain
Roman Catholic churches completed in 1776
Neoclassical church buildings in Spain